Newyears Green is a hamlet of the London Borough of Hillingdon in London, England. It lies 16.6 miles (26.7 kilometers) northwest of Charing Cross.

It is situated south of Harefield, west of Ruislip and north of Ickenham, in Greater London.  The etymology behind the name of the town is unknown.

References

External links

Districts of the London Borough of Hillingdon
Areas of London
Places formerly in Middlesex